Starobelokurikha is a rural locality (a selo) in Starobelokurikhinsky Selsoviet, Altaysky District, Altai Krai, Russia. The population was 1,517 as of 2013. There are 18 streets.

Geography 
Starobelokurikha is located 34 km northwest of Altayskoye (the district's administrative centre) by road. Belokurikha is the nearest rural locality.

References 

Rural localities in Altaysky District, Altai Krai